Cornus macrophylla, commonly known as the large-leafed dogwood, is a species of dogwood found in Afghanistan, Bhutan, India, Kashmir, Myanmar, Nepal, Pakistan, Taiwan, and several provinces in China, including Anhui, Fujian, Gansu, Guangdong, Guangxi, Guizhou, Hainan, Hubei, Hunan, Jiangsu, Jiangxi, Ningxia, Shaanxi, Shandong, Sichuan, Xizang, Yunnan, and Zhejiang.

References

External links
 
 
 

macrophylla